Fishing Hawk Creek is a stream in the U.S. state of West Virginia.

Fishing Hawk Creek was named after the fish hawk native to the area.

See also
List of rivers of West Virginia

References

Rivers of Randolph County, West Virginia
Rivers of West Virginia